Aygerim or  Aigerim   is a Kazakh female given name which is common in Kyrgyzstan and Kazakhstan, and means "wonderful moon." It is related to the Azerbaijani name .

Given name
 Aigerim Unesskz, Kazakh Belly Dancer
 Aigerim Aitymova, Kazakh footballer
 Aigerim Alimbozova, Kazakh footballer
 Aigerim Alimkulova, Kazakh footballer
 Aygerim Kozhakanova Kazakh model
 Aigerim Mergenbay, Kazakh singer and actress under the name C.C.TAY
 Aigerim Tazhi, Kazakh poet
 Aigerim Zhexembinova Kazakh synchronized swimmer

References

Turkic feminine given names